Fuenlabrada is a city and municipality of Spain located in the Community of Madrid. , it has a population of 193,586, making it the region's fourth most populated municipality.

Placename 
The etymology of Fuenlabrada comes from the contraction of Fuente Labrada, Spanish for "carved fountain".

Geography 

The highest point in the municipality (721 metres above sea level) is located in a hill to the northwest of the city proper.
The city proper's altitude gently decreases from the Northwest to the Southeast; the lowest areas in the municipality (slightly over 600 metres above sea level) are located in the East, past the A-42 near the border with Getafe.

The residential area of  (203.6 ha in size) lies in the west, near Móstoles, semi-detached from the main urban nucleus by the  highway.

Other parts of the municipality (including the Arroyo de Fregacedos) are however part of the Guadarrama catchment area.

History 
There are archeological sites tracing back the human presence in the area to the Paleolithic (La Cantueña) and the Bronze Age (Casas del Cerro). Other settlements in the current municipal area, including Loranca, Albas and Fregacedos, existed during the Upper Middle Ages.

The founding of the village of Fuenlabrada has been tentatively traced to the late 14th century, populated by the dwellers of the nearby settlements of Loranca, Albas and Fregacedos, which had been simultaneously depopulated. The first mention of Fuenlabrada, which by the early 16th century was part of the Land of Madrid, was recorded later in the century, during the reign of Philip II, in the so-called Topographic Relations of Philip II. The village suffered the loss of a quarter of the population in the second half of the 18th century.

Following the end of the 1936–1939 Civil War, in which some parts of Fuenlabrada endured serious damage, the Dirección General de Regiones Devastadas undertook some building works in the municipality during the 1940s and 1950s.

The population experienced a demographic explosion in the 1970s, going from 7,369 inhabitants in 1970 to 65,181 in 1980, the biggest relative increase in Spain in that period. The demographic growth continued in the ensuing decades.

Since the 1979 municipal elections, the municipality has been a stronghold of the Spanish Socialist Workers' Party (PSOE) and has been part of the so-called "red belt" of the Community of Madrid.

Transport

Roads 
The city is linked with the M-50, A-42, M-506, M-407 and M-409 highways. It is connected as well to the neighbouring towns of Humanes de Madrid and Moraleja de Enmedio through the M-413 and M-405 local roads, respectively.

Metro 
Fuenlabrada has  good transport connections with Madrid, Móstoles, Getafe, Alcorcón and Leganés through the Madrid Metro line 12 (also known as Metrosur), including five stations: Loranca, Hospital de Fuenlabrada, Parque Europa, Fuenlabrada Central (transfer with Fuenlabrada Cercanías station) and Parque de los Estados.

Commuter train 
Fuenlabrada is connected to Madrid via the Cercanías Madrid line C-5, a commuter train service, having two stations: Fuenlabrada (Transfer with Fuenlabrada Central metro station) and La Serna.

Demography 
Fuenlabrada witnessed a dramatic population explosion in the 1980s, due to large scale immigration of young workers coming from the capital city and other agrarian regions (chiefly Extremadura, Castilla-La Mancha, Andalusia and Galicia) seeking affordable prices in housing. By 1975, the municipality had already reached a population of 18,442. Foreign workers have also settled in the city, most of them coming from Latin America, Africa, the Maghreb, China and Romania.

Education

Primary and Secondary education 
Fuenlabrada has 33 kindergarten and daycare centers, 50 primary schools and 15 secondary schools.

Higher education 
The Universidad Rey Juan Carlos (URJC) has a secondary campus in the city, housing the faculties of communication sciences, telecommunications engineering, tourism, business administration, among other courses.

The National University of Distance Education (UNED) also has a branch here.

Sports

The city is home to basketball team Baloncesto Fuenlabrada, currently playing in the first tier division (Liga ACB), having competed in the top flight division of Spanish basketball for several years. Their home games are played at Fernando Martín sports centre, which has a capacity of 5,700.

CF Fuenlabrada is the local football team, playing in Segunda División (second tier in Spanish league). They play as home team at the Estadio Fernando Torres, inaugurated by the footballer's parents on 1 September 2011. The stadium has a capacity of 7,500.

Due to the war in Croatia, Partizan had to play abroad as the host in the 1991/1992 season. The management of the club decided to "host" in the Madrid suburb of Fuenlabrada, and that season they became champions of the old continent.

Twin towns and sister cities 
 San Juan del Río Coco, Nicaragua (since 1988)
 Joal-Fadiouth, Senegal (since 1999)

Notable people
 Roberto Jiménez (born 1986), professional footballer
 Fernando Torres (born 1984), professional footballer

References 
Citations

Bibliography

External links

Official website of Fuenlabrada 

 
Municipalities in the Community of Madrid